Yesgaon is a village in Kopargaon taluka (tahsil), Ahmednagar district, Maharashtra, India.

Economy
Most people of Yesgaon are farmers. Popular crops are sugarcane, wheat, and onions.

Its Pincode is 423603. Its STD code is 02423.

Notable people
 Shankarrao Genuji Kolhe, Member of the Legislative Assembly (MLA) and Minister in Government of Maharashtra

References

Villages in Ahmednagar district